Mikołaj Spytek Ligęza (c. 1562–1637) was a Polish–Lithuanian noble (szlachcic). He was castellan of Czechów, Żarnów, Sandomierz and was owner of Rzeszów.

He was son of Mikołaj Ligęza and Elżbieta Jordan.

He had two children: daughters Zofia Pudencjanna Ligęza and Konstancja Ligęza.

References

Notes

Secular senators of the Polish–Lithuanian Commonwealth
1560s births
1637 deaths
16th-century Polish nobility
People from Rzeszów
Mikolaj
17th-century Polish nobility